Sea Pines is a historic archeological site located at Sea Pines Resort, Hilton Head Island, Beaufort County, South Carolina. The site is one of 20 or more prehistoric Indian shell middens in a ring shape located from the central coast of South Carolina to the central coast of Georgia.  It is believed to date early in the second millennium BC, and to contain some of the earliest pottery known in North America. The Sea Pines ring stands about two feet above a flat central area, which is about five feet above mean sea level.

It was listed in the National Register of Historic Places in 1970.

References

Archaeological sites on the National Register of Historic Places in South Carolina
Buildings and structures in Beaufort County, South Carolina
National Register of Historic Places in Beaufort County, South Carolina
Shell rings